Cyrano de Bergerac is a four-act opera with music by Franco Alfano, and libretto by Henri Caïn, based on Edmond Rostand's 1897 drama Cyrano de Bergerac.

History
The opera received its first performance at the Teatro dell'Opera di Roma on 22 January 1936, conducted by Tullio Serafin, with Maria Caniglia and José Luccioni. The first performance in Paris was on 29 May 1936 at the Opéra-Comique.

Although Alfano originally set the text in French, the premiere was sung in Italian, as were many early Italian productions. In recent years, most productions have returned to the original French text, which was used in the Paris premiere.

Contemporary commentary on the opera by Guido M. Gatti criticised the composer as fearing "to seem too melodramatic", and the opera for being "overdecorated and labored" and containing "difficult and tortuous vocal writing". However, the same analysis also mentioned that "the opera has moments of definite effectiveness and exquisite poetry".

The US premiere was on 13 May 2005, when the opera was presented at the Metropolitan Opera with Plácido Domingo in the title role. In May 2017 it was presented anew at the Metropolitan Opera with Roberto Alagna in the title role, and soprano Jennifer Rowley as the female lead Roxane in her Metropolitan Opera role debut.

Roles

Recordings
 Opera d'Oro, a division of Allegro Corporation (OPD 1411): William Johns, Olivia Stapp, Ezio di Cesare; Maurizio Arena, conductor; recorded in Turin 1975
 CPO 5210620: Manuela Uhl, Jennifer Arnold, Susanna Bernhard, Roman Sadnik, Wolfgang Newerla, Simon Pauly, Paul McNamara, Matthias Klein, Bernd Gebhardt, Konstantin Heintel; Chorus of Kiel Opera; Kiel Philharmonic Orchestra; Markus L. Frank, conductor (2002)
 Live broadcast from the Met (not commercially released, available from archive.org): Radvanovsky/Barasorda/Very/Michaels-Moore/de Candia; in New York; Armiliato, conductor (2006): part 1, part 2
 Naxos (DVD): Radvanovsky/Domingo/Chacón Cruz/Gilfry/Corrado Caruso; in Valencia; Patrick Fournillier, conductor (2007)

References

Operas by Franco Alfano
Italian-language operas
Verismo operas
Operas
1936 operas
French-language operas
Operas based on plays
Works based on Cyrano de Bergerac (play)
Operas set in France